The Vayu computer cluster, was the predecessor of Raijin, the Current Peak System of the Australian National Computational Infrastructure, located at the Australian National University in Canberra, Australian Capital Territory. It was based on a Sun Microsystems Sun Constellation System. The Vayu system was taken from Sun's code name for the compute blade within the system. Vayu is a [Hindu] god], the name meaning "wind".
The cluster was officially launched on 2009-11-16 by the Government of Australia's Minister for Innovation, Industry, Science and Research, Senator Kim Carr,[2] after provisional acceptance on 2009-09-18.[3]

Performance
Vayu was first operated in September 2009 with one eighth of the final computing power, with the full system commissioned in March 2010.

Vayu has the following performance characteristics:
 Peak performance: 140 TFlops
 Sustained: 250K SPECfp rate
 Resources: 110M hrs p.a.

Physical system
The system comprises:
 11936 CPUs in 1492 nodes in Sun X6275 blades, each containing
 two quad-core 2.93 GHz Intel Nehalem CPUs
 24Gbyte DDR3-1333 memory
 24GB Flash DIMM for swap and job scratch
 total: 36.9TB of RAM on compute nodes
 Dual socket, quad-core Sun X4170, X4270, X4275 servers for Lustre fileserving
 approx 835TBytes of global user storage

Power consumption of the full 11936 CPU system will be approx 605 kW, but all the power used will be from green energy sources.

Software
System software for the Vayu cluster includes:
 CentOS 5.4 Linux distribution (based on Red Hat Enterprise Linux 5.4)
 the oneSIS cluster software management system
 the Lustre cluster file system
 the National Facility's variant of the OpenPBS batch queuing system

Funding
The national government has provided around A$26m to enable the building of the centre and installation of Vayu. Other participating organisations included the Australian Bureau of Meteorology, Australian National University, and the Commonwealth Scientific and Industrial Research Organisation, cooperating using an integrated computational environment for the earth systems sciences, including investigating aspects of operational weather forecasting through to climate modelling and prediction. The ANU and CSIRO each subscribed about A$3m, thereby getting about a quarter of the machine.

The ANU and CSIRO, with the support of the Australian Government have already made plans for funding Vayu's replacement, in about 2011-2012, with a machine about 12 times more powerful.

See also
 Top500

References

External links
 NCI facilities

X86 supercomputers
Australian National University
CSIRO